Onkar Sahota is a British Labour Party politician who has served as Chair of the London Assembly since May 2022 and as member of the London Assembly for Ealing and Hillingdon since 2012, when he became the first Labour candidate to be elected in Ealing and Hillingdon. He has since been re-elected twice for the seat.

Early life 
Onkar Sahota grew up in Southall during the 1960s as one of five children, having three sisters and a brother. His parents had moved to the UK from India. His father originally worked for British Airways before opening his own greengrocery.

Since childhood, Sahota had always wanted to be a doctor. He studied medicine at the University of Sheffield, graduating in 1983, and is now a general practitioner at a surgery in Southall.

Political career 
In 2012, Sahota was elected the new member for Ealing & Hillingdon on a 9.2% swing, defeating incumbent Conservative member and Deputy Mayor of London Richard Barnes. Sahota was re-elected in 2016 with an increased majority. He served as the London Assembly Labour Group's lead spokesperson on health and was Chair of the Assembly's Health Committee. 

Sahota was re-elected in 2021 but with his majority halved. In May 2022, Sahota was elected as Chair of the London Assembly.

Policy 
Sahota opposes the planned closure of the accident and emergency (A&E) ward at Ealing Hospital, and launched a petition to keep the facility open. The campaign was ultimately successful and the closure plans were scrapped. Sahota has also campaigned on issues including the Southall Waterside development and the impact of budgetary pressures on London's accident and emergency departments.

References 

Living people
20th-century British medical doctors
Labour Members of the London Assembly
British politicians of Indian descent
Alumni of the University of Sheffield
Year of birth missing (living people)